Teleșeuca is a commune in Dondușeni District, Moldova. It is composed of two villages, Teleșeuca (formerly Teleșăuca Veche), and Teleșeuca Nouă (formerly Teleșăuca Nouă).

References

Communes of Dondușeni District